The 2022–2023 mpox outbreak in Japan is a part of the larger outbreak of human mpox caused by the West African clade of the monkeypox virus. According to the Ministry of Health, Japan's first mpox case was reported in Tokyo on 25 July 2022.

Background 

An ongoing outbreak of mpox was confirmed on 6 May 2022, beginning with a British resident who, after travelling to Nigeria (where the disease is endemic), presented symptoms consistent with mpox on 29 April 2022. The resident returned to the United Kingdom on 4 May, creating the country's index case of the outbreak. The origin of several of the cases of mpox in the United Kingdom is unknown. Some monitors saw community transmission taking place in the London area as of mid-May, but it has been suggested that cases were already spreading in Europe in the previous months.

Timeline 
The first known case of the mpox outbreak in Japan was detected on 25 July 2022. According to the Ministry of Health, the index case was a man in his 30s who had recently traveled to Europe, and he had contact with someone who was later diagnosed with mpox. On 28 July 2022, Japan confirmed its second case of mpox, from a man in his 30s in Tokyo and he had recently traveled abroad. It was officially said one victim had no contact with the other victim. On 5 August 2022, Japan confirmed an additional mpox case.  On August 11, a fourth case was reported.  On October 6, 2 new cases were reported.  One day later, a 7th case was reported. On December 29, an 8th case was reported.

Notes

References

Japan
Mpox
Mpox
2022 disasters in Japan